The 1989–90 Ohio State Buckeyes men's basketball team represented Ohio State University as a member of the Big Ten Conference during the 1989–90 NCAA men's college basketball season. The Buckeyes finished with an overall record of 17–13 (10–8 Big Ten) and received an at-large bid to the NCAA tournament. After defeating Providence, 84–83 in OT, in the opening round, Ohio State lost to eventual National champion UNLV, 76–65, in the second round.

Roster

Practice team members Chad Fast, Dave Kivimaki

Schedule and results

|-
!colspan=9| Regular Season

|-
!colspan=9| NCAA tournament

References

External links
1989-90 OHIO STATE BASKETBALL STATISTICS at Ohiostatebuckeyes.com
1989-90 Ohio State Buckeyes Roster and Stats at Sports-Reference.com

Ohio State Buckeyes men's basketball seasons
Ohio State Buckeyes
Ohio State
Ohio State Buckeyes
Ohio State Buckeyes